Free territory may refer to:

 Associated state, a territory with a degree of statehood in free relationship with a (usually larger) nation
 Autonomous administrative division, an internal territory of a sovereign state that has a degree of self-governing autonomy
 Free Catalan Territory, a group of municipalities that support the independence of Catalonia
 Free economic zone, a type of special economic zone designated for low taxation
 Free Territory of Trieste, a city-state bordering Italy and Yugoslavia, 1947–1977
 Free Territory of Freedomland, a micronation that covered the Spratly Islands in the South China Sea, 1956–1974
 Free area of the Republic of China, territories under the control of the Republic of China, commonly known as Taiwan, –present 
 , the liberated territories of Yugoslavia during World War II, 1941–1945
 Makhnovshchina, an anarchist society during the Ukrainian War of Independence, 1917–1921

See also

Free Zone (disambiguation)
Unorganized territory (disambiguation)